The Abelitz (-litz = Leide = channel) is a river of Lower Saxony, Germany, in East Frisia. This type of river that drains the low-lying polders through a sluice in the sea dyke is also known locally as a Tief and is often the course of an old creek between mudflats.

The Abelitz passes through Südbrookmerland, where it flows past the village of the same name,  (a district of Südbrookmerland), and the Krummhörn. The banks of the Abelitz are often near-natural and covered in reed beds. There are several parallel channels (Nebenläufe) that enclose small islands or run through wetlands. The river is very rich in fish and is well known as an angling area.

The bird life on and near the Abelitz is very diverse. During the breeding season riverside walkers and anglers are expected to conduct themselves considerately.

The Abelitz is linked to Moordorf by the Abelitz-Moordorf Canal.

See also
List of rivers of Lower Saxony

References

Rivers of Lower Saxony
Geography of East Frisia
Rivers of Germany